Adrian Bielawski (born 14 April 1996) is a Polish footballer who plays as a right back for Warta Gorzów.

Senior career

Bielawski started his career with Lechia Gdańsk, making the move up to the Lechia second team in 2012. After a good start with the Lechia second team, Bielawski joined Olimpia Grudziądz for the 2013-14 season. His time at Olimpia proved to be successful, and the following season he rejoined Olimpia on loan for another season. In total, Bielawski played with Olimpia for 3 seasons on loan, before making the move permanent in 2016. In 2018 he extended his contract with Olimpia, before leaving the club 6 months later. In total Bielawski spend five and a half seasons with Olimpia, making a total of 54 appearances in the league during that time.

On 6 February 2019, Bielawski joined III liga team Warta Gorzów. He spent 5 months with Warta, playing 13 games and scoring his first professional goals in football, scoring 5 in total during his spell at the club. Despite his impressive goal-scoring record from defense, Bielawski was unable to help Warta avoid relegation. He moved to II liga team Bytovia Bytów on 11 July 2019. During the pre-season Bielawski was involved in a friendly playing against the team where he started his career, Lechia Gdańsk, playing in the second half of a 7-1 defeat.

References

External links
 

Polish footballers
1996 births
Living people
Association football defenders
Sportspeople from Gdańsk
Sportspeople from Pomeranian Voivodeship
Poland youth international footballers
Lechia Gdańsk II players
Olimpia Grudziądz players